Sean Anthony Manaea (born February 1, 1992) is an American professional baseball pitcher for the San Francisco Giants of Major League Baseball (MLB). He has previously played in MLB for the Oakland Athletics and San Diego Padres. He played college baseball at Indiana State University.

While attending Indiana State, Manaea was named the best prospect in the Cape Cod Baseball League in 2012. The Kansas City Royals selected Manaea with the 34th pick in the 2013 MLB draft, and traded him to the Athletics during the 2015 season. He debuted in MLB in 2016, and pitched a no-hitter on April 21, 2018. Oakland traded Manaea to the Padres before the 2022 season.

Amateur career
Manaea was raised in Wanatah, Indiana, population 1,000. He attended South Central Junior-Senior High School in Union Mills, Indiana, for his first three years of high school. After his junior year, he competed in the first All-Indiana Crossroads Showcase Series. Manaea transferred to Andrean High School in Merrillville, Indiana. Playing for the baseball team at Andrean, Manaea was part of the state champions in 2010, his senior year.

Not selected in the Major League Baseball (MLB) draft out of high school, Manaea enrolled at Indiana State University (ISU), where he played college baseball for the Indiana State Sycamores baseball team, competing in the Missouri Valley Conference of NCAA's Division I. After his freshman year at ISU, Manaea played collegiate summer baseball for the Dubois County Bombers of the Prospect League. Manaea was 5–3 with a 3.34 ERA and recorded 115 strikeouts (13th in the nation) in 105 innings pitched for the Sycamores as a sophomore. 

Following his sophomore year at Indiana State, he competed for the Hyannis Harbor Hawks in the Cape Cod Baseball League, where he went 5–1 with a 1.22 earned run average (ERA) and a league-leading 85 strikeouts (setting the modern record for a single summer) in  innings pitched, and won the league's Outstanding Prospect Award, and was named the B.F.C Whitehouse Top Pitcher, Summer National Player of the Year by Perfect Game USA, and the Cape Cod League's top prospect by Baseball America. In 2013, Manaea was named a Preseason All-American and added to the National Pitcher of the Year Watch List. He compiled a 5–4 record, a 1.47 ERA, and 93 strikeouts in  innings, ranking fourth in the nation in strikeouts per 9 innings pitched (11.4), while leading the league with 5 balks.

Professional career

Kansas City Royals
Considered a top prospect in the 2013 Major League Baseball draft, Manaea was scouted by the Houston Astros, who had the first overall pick. However, he had a hip injury that he pitched through during his junior year at Indiana State. Misdiagnosed as a hip impingement that he could play through as it healed, Manaea pitched through pain and saw his velocity decrease. He was not selected until the Kansas City Royals took him with the 34th pick of the draft. The Royals signed Manaea to a $3.55 million signing bonus, above the recommended value for the 34th pick of $1,623,000. He had surgery to repair a torn acetabular labrum in his hip and missed the remainder of the 2013 season.

Healthy in time for spring training in 2014, the Royals assigned Manaea to the Wilmington Blue Rocks of the Class A-Advanced Carolina League, with the plan to limit him to 150 innings pitched for the 2014 season. Manaea had a 7–8 record with a 3.11 ERA in 25 games started, leading the Carolina League with 146 strikeouts in 121.2 innings (10.8 strikeouts per 9 innings). He was named an MiLB Organization 2014 All Star.

He missed the beginning of the 2015 season with abdominal and groin injuries. After making four starts for Wilmington, Manaea received a promotion to the Northwest Arkansas Naturals of the Class AA Texas League in July, for whom he pitched seven innings.

Oakland Athletics
The Royals traded Manaea and Aaron Brooks to the Oakland Athletics on July 28, 2015, in exchange for Ben Zobrist. The Athletics assigned him to the Midland RockHounds of the Texas League. With Midland, Manaea made seven starts, and had a 1.90 ERA with 51 strikeouts in  innings pitched. He was named an MiLB Organization 2015 All Star. Pitching for the Mesa Solar Sox in 2015, he was named an AFL Rising Star and to the AFL All-Prospect Team.

He began the 2016 season with the Nashville Sounds of the Class AAA Pacific Coast League.

After he made three starts for Nashville, with whom he was 2–0 with a 1.50 ERA in 18 innings with 21 strikeouts, the Athletics promoted Manaea to the major leagues to make his debut on April 29. In his rookie season in 2016, Manaea pitched to a 7–9 win–loss record and a 3.86 ERA in 25 games (24 starts) covering 144.2 innings. Manaea was placed on the 10-day disabled list due to a left shoulder strain on April 30, 2017.

Manaea completed his 16th consecutive outing in which he pitched at least two innings allowing no more than five hits on June 5. Manaea surpassed Tom Gordon's streak of 15 games (June 24 – September 2, 1992), becoming the longest such streak by an American League (AL) pitcher since 1913. In 16 starts prior to the All-Star break, Manaea had a 3.76 ERA. He ended the 2017 season with a 12–10 record and a 4.37 ERA in 29 starts covering 158.2 innings.

On April 21, 2018, Manaea no-hit the Boston Red Sox 3–0 at Oakland-Alameda County Coliseum, becoming the first Athletics pitcher to throw a no-hitter since Dallas Braden's perfect game in 2010. He struck out 10 and walked two. With a .894 winning percentage, the Red Sox had the best record, at the time, of any team to be no-hit in baseball history. Manaea and Manny Machado were named the AL's Co-Players of the Week for the week ending April 22. In his next start against the Houston Astros on April 27, Manaea pitched seven scoreless innings and struck out seven as the A's won 8–1. In August, Manaea went on the disabled list due to an impingement in his left shoulder. On September 11, he was ruled out for the rest of the season due to arthroscopic surgery to repair the impingement. He ended the 2018 season with a 12–9 record in 27 starts covering 160.2 innings in which he averaged 7.9 hits and 1.8 walks per 9 innings, with a 1.077 WHIP, and his 9 wild pitches were 10th in the AL. He tied for the major league lead in bunt hits given up, with six.

Manaea began the 2019 season rehabilitating his shoulder, aiming to return to the Athletics at midseason. He made his season debut in September. In five starts, he was 4–0 with 30 strikeouts in  innings. Earning the start in the 2019 AL Wild Card Game against the Tampa Bay Rays. He allowed four runs on four hits, including three home runs, despite striking out five, leading to his exit after two-plus innings in an eventual 5–1 Oakland loss.

In 2020, Manaea and the Athletics agreed to a $3.75 million salary. He finished the pandemic-shortened season with a record of 4–3 and a 4.50 ERA in 11 starts covering 54 innings. As Oakland advanced in the playoffs, Manaea pitched against the Houston Astros in Game 2 of the 2020 American League Division Series. He took the loss as he allowed four runs in  innings.

Manaea and the Athletics agreed on a $5.95 million salary for the 2021 season. He led the AL with 32 starts and two shutouts for the Athletics in 2021, and went 11–10 with a 3.91 ERA (10th in the AL) with 194 strikeouts (8th) in 179.2 innings (8th), with 4.732 strikeouts/walk (4th), 2.058 walks per 9 innings (6th), 9.736 strikeouts per 9 innings (7th), 8.983 hits per 9 innings (9th), 1.255 home runs/9 innings (9th), and a 1.227 WHIP (10th). On March 22, 2022, Manaea signed a $9.75 million contract with Oakland, avoiding salary arbitration.

San Diego Padres
On April 3, 2022, the Athletics traded Manaea and Aaron Holiday to the San Diego Padres for Adrián Martínez and Euribiel Angeles.  In 2022 with San Diego he was 8–9 with a 4.96 ERA in 30 games (28 starts) in which he pitched 158 innings and struck out 156 batters.

Manaea became a free agent following the conclusion of the 2022 season.

San Francisco Giants
On December 16, 2022, Manaea signed a two-year, $25 million contract with the San Francisco Giants.

Personal life
Manaea's father, Faaloloi, moved from American Samoa to Hawaii, served in the Vietnam War, and was then stationed in Indiana, where he immediately settled. Faaloloi worked for the Inland Steel Company following his military service. His mother, Opal, is a factory worker. Manaea has two older brothers—a half-brother from his father's first marriage and a full brother. One of his brothers, Dane, is in the United States Navy.

Manaea first visited American Samoa in 2014. There, he began his sleeve tattoo, using traditional Samoan symbols.

See also

List of Major League Baseball no-hitters

References

External links

1992 births
Living people
American sportspeople of Samoan descent
Baseball players from Indiana
Hyannis Harbor Hawks players
Indiana State Sycamores baseball players
Major League Baseball pitchers
Midland RockHounds players
Nashville Sounds players
Northwest Arkansas Naturals players
Oakland Athletics players
People from LaPorte County, Indiana
People from Merrillville, Indiana
San Diego Padres players
Stockton Ports players
Wilmington Blue Rocks players